Faie is an associated commune located in the commune of Huahine on the island of the same name, in French Polynesia.

References

Populated places in the Society Islands